Bhagwan Dev Acharya is an Indian politician.  He was elected to the Lok Sabha, the lower house of the Parliament of India from Ajmer, Rajasthan as a member of the Indian National Congress.

References

External links
  Official biographical sketch in Parliament of India website

1935 births
Living people
India MPs 1980–1984
Lok Sabha members from Rajasthan
Indian National Congress politicians
Indian National Congress politicians from Rajasthan